Terry Matterson (born 4 March 1967) is an Australian rugby league coach and former player. Matterson played in Australia's premiership for the Eastern Suburbs Roosters and the Brisbane Broncos, and was also selected to play in the State of Origin for New South Wales once in 1989. He was a goal-kicking  and he played the majority of his club football for the Brisbane Broncos, with whom he won the 1992 and 1993 premierships, in addition to stints with the Eastern Suburbs Roosters and the London Broncos. He worked as a head coach in the Super League for the Castleford Tigers between 2005 and 2011. From October 2013 Matterson was the head coach of the United States.

Background
Matterson was born in Auburn, New South Wales, Australia.

Playing
This would stand as the record for most individual points in a Broncos game for over fourteen years. In 1989 Matterson represented New South Wales in the State of Origin, playing against many of his Broncos' teammates. He was also named player of the series for the 1989 Panasonic Cup tournament.

Matterson went on to play in the Broncos' inaugural grand final victory in 1992. In the weeks following the grand final he travelled with the Broncos to England, where he played at lock forward in the 1992 World Club Challenge against British champions Wigan, putting in a man-of-the-match performance to help Brisbane become the first NSWRL club to win the match in Britain. Matterson helped Brisbane to their second consecutive premiership in 1993, scoring a try in the Grand Final against St George.

Matterson joined the London Broncos in 1995. At the time he was the Brisbane club's top point-scorer, as well as record-holder of most points scored in a single match.

During the 2007 season at the Brisbane Broncos' 20-year anniversary celebration, the club announced a list of the 20 best players to play for them to date which included Matterson. Matterson also was inducted into the Brisbane Broncos official Hall of Fame.

Coaching
Terry Matterson coached English Super League club the Castleford Tigers from 2005. Matterson expressed interest in taking over from Wayne Bennett as coach of the Brisbane Broncos at the end of the 2008 National Rugby League season. Matterson stayed with the Castleford Tigers after they were relegated in 2006. He guided the team straight back up to regain its place in the Super League. Matterson then signed a new 3-year deal to stay at the Castleford Tigers. Matterson guided the Castleford Tigers to 7th place in Super League 2009. The club's first play-off finish since 2002. They faced Wigan Warriors at the DW Stadium and lost 18–12 with Joe Westerman scoring 8 points.

Pressure grew on Matterson during 2010 after the Castleford Tigers lost to Barrow Raiders at home in the Challenge Cup. Several hundred supporters gathered at the back of the main stand and vented frustration at Matterson and the club's board. Matterson and the team went on a rough patch but turned it around and only just missed out on a second play-off appearance in two years by losing out to St. Helens in the final league game of the season. Matterson hoped to improve the Castleford Tigers further in 2011 which would be his last season with the club. In 2011, Matterson was named as the assistant coach of the Exiles, a team made up of Australian and New Zealand players contracted to Super League clubs. The Exiles played against the England in June 2011 in the Rugby League International Origin Match, a fixture that is intended to become an annual contest in the future. Matterson will be assisting the Head coach of the RL Exiles, Brian McClennan. Matterson announced on 4 July 2011 that it would be his last season at the Castleford Tigers and he would leave the club at the end of that year. This took him to 6 years at the Castleford Tigers. Matterson will go back home to Australia to become assistant coach of the North Queensland Cowboys for 2012. For their 2013 Rugby League World Cup campaign, the United States appointed Matterson as coach for the tournament.

Career Stats

NRL

Personal life
Matterson has a son named Charlie Matterson.

In January 2010, Matterson lost his left ring finger in a training accident where his wedding ring snagged on a fence. Surgery to re-attach the finger was unsuccessful, however Matterson seemed unaffected by the trauma, continuing to coach the Castleford Tigers the next week. His older brother Greg Matterson became the head coach of New South Wales Cup side Newtown Jets. Matterson is the uncle of Parramatta Eels' Ryan Matterson.

References

Footnotes

External links
  Matterson named new Tigers coach - article at news.bbc.co.uk
Terry Matterson at yesterdayshero.com.au
Terry Matterson at nrlstats.com

1967 births
Living people
Australian amputees
Australian rugby league coaches
Australian rugby league players
Brisbane Broncos players
Castleford Tigers coaches
Exiles rugby league team coaches
Gold Coast Titans coaches
London Broncos players
New South Wales Rugby League State of Origin players
Rugby league five-eighths
Rugby league locks
Rugby league players from Sydney
Sydney Roosters players
United States national rugby league team coaches